Evgeniy Sviridov (born 1974) is a professional bandy player from Belarus. He has been playing for Sibselmash Novosibirsk in the Russian Bandy Super League and represented his native Belarus in a number of Bandy World Championships.

References

External links
 
 

Belarusian bandy players
Sibselmash players
1974 births
Living people